Tri Tôn is an urban municipality (trấn thuộc huyện) and town in the Tri Tôn District of An Giang Province, Vietnam.

Communes of An Giang province
Populated places in An Giang province
District capitals in Vietnam
Townships in Vietnam